Sundridge/South River Airpark  is a registered aerodrome located  southeast of South River, Ontario, Canada, in the township of Joly.

References

Registered aerodromes in Parry Sound District